Mike Gregorian is an American former soccer player who earned one cap with the U.S. national team in 1988.

Youth and college
Gregorian grew up in Culver City, California where he played forward for the Fram club of Culver-Palisades which won the 1986 McGuire Cup (U-19 national championship).  He attended Cal State Los Angeles with fellow Fram team mate Steve Sengelmann.  Gregorian finished his four-year career (1986–1990) at CSLA with thirty goals and twelve assists.  He spent the 1988 collegiate off season with the California Kickers of the Western Soccer Alliance and the 1989 collegiate off season with the San Diego Nomads.  In July 1990, the St. Louis Storm selected Gregorian in the fourth round of the Major Soccer League draft.

National team
Gregorian earned one cap with the U.S. national team in a 1-0 loss to Guatemala on January 10, 1988.  He came off for Chris Sullivan.

References

American soccer players
California Kickers players
Los Angeles Heat players
Western Soccer Alliance players
United States men's international soccer players
Living people
Association football midfielders
Year of birth missing (living people)